Ceuta and Melilla may refer to:
 
Spain's two autonomous cities, Ceuta and Melilla, which are often referred to together
in a wider sense, to all the modern Spanish possessions in North Africa (i.e. Ceuta and Melilla, plus other adjacent minor territories, known in Spanish as plazas de soberanía)

See also
Spanish Africa (disambiguation)
Spanish North Africa (disambiguation)
Spanish protectorate in Morocco, established on 27 November 1912 by a treaty between France and Spain that converted the Spanish sphere of influence into a formal protectorate
List of Spanish colonial wars in Morocco